Dicaea or Dikaia may refer to:
Dicaea (Macedonia), a town of ancient Macedonia, Greece
Dicaea (Thrace), a town of ancient Thrace, Greece
Dikaia, a town in modern Greece